Dorothea Sally Eilers (December 11, 1908 – January 5, 1978) was an American actress.

Early life
Eilers was born in New York City to a Jewish-American mother, Paula (or Pauline) Schoenberger, and a German-American father, Hio Peter Eilers (an inventor). She had one sibling, a brother, Hio Peter Eilers Jr. When Eilers was young, she moved to Los Angeles with her parents, and in 1927 she graduated from Fairfax High School.

Career
She made her film debut in 1927 in The Red Mill, directed by Roscoe Arbuckle. After several minor roles as an extra, in 1927–1928 she found work with Mack Sennett as one of his "flaming youth" comedians in several comedy short subjects, along with Carole Lombard, who had been a school friend. In 1928, she was voted as one of the WAMPAS Baby Stars, a yearly list of young actresses selected by publicity people in the film business, with selection based on the actresses' having "shown the most promise during the past 12 months."

Eilers was a popular figure in early-1930s Hollywood, known for her high spirits and vivacity. Her films were mostly comedies and crime melodramas such as Quick Millions (1931) with Spencer Tracy and George Raft. By the end of the decade, her popularity had waned, and her subsequent film appearances were few. She made her final film appearance in Stage to Tucson (1950).

Personal life

She was married four times, beginning with Western actor Hoot Gibson. She and her second husband, Harry Joe Brown, had one child, a son, Harry Joe Brown Jr. (1934–2006). She lived in a mansion in Beverly Hills, California designed by architect Paul R. Williams. Eilers was a Democrat who supported Adlai Stevenson's campaign during the 1952 presidential election. Like her mother, Eilers adhered to Judaism.

Death
During her final years, Eilers suffered poor health, and died from a heart attack on January 5, 1978, in Woodland Hills, California, at the age of 69. She was cremated and her remains were interred in a small niche in the Freedom Mausoleum, Columbarium of Understanding, Forest Lawn Memorial Park Cemetery, Glendale, California.

Partial filmography

 The Red Mill (1927) (uncredited)
 Sunrise: A Song of Two Humans (1927)
 Paid to Love (1927)
 The Cradle Snatchers (1927)
 The Campus Vamp (1928) (short subject)
 Fazil (1928)
 The Good-Bye Kiss (1928)
 The Crowd (1928)
 Dry Martini (1928)
 Broadway Babies (1929)
 Weary River (1929)
 Sailor's Holiday (1929)
 The Long Long Trail (1929)
 The Show of Shows (1929)
 She Couldn't Say No (1930)
 Let Us Be Gay (1930)
 Doughboys (1930)
 Trigger Tricks (1930)
 Roaring Ranch (1930)
 Clearing the Range (1931)
 Parlor, Bedroom and Bath (1931)
 Quick Millions (1931)
 The Black Camel (1931)
 A Holy Terror (1931)
 Over the Hill (1931)
 Reducing (1931)
 Bad Girl (1931)
 Disorderly Conduct (1932)
 Hat Check Girl (1932)
 Hold Me Tight (1933)
 Made on Broadway (1933)
 Sailor's Luck (1933)
 Second Hand Wife (1933)
 Central Airport (1933)
 State Fair (1933)
 Walls of Gold (1933)
 She Made Her Bed (1934)
 Three on a Honeymoon (1934)
 I Spy (1934)
 Pursuit (1935)
 Alias Mary Dow (1935)
 Carnival (1935)
 Remember Last Night? (1935)
 Don't Get Personal (1936)
 Florida Special (1936)
 Talk of the Devil (1936) (British)
 Without Orders (1936)
 Strike Me Pink (1936)
 Danger Patrol (1937)
 We Have Our Moments (1937)
 Lady Behave! (1937)
 Tarnished Angel (1938)
 Condemned Women (1938)
 Everybody's Doing It (1938)
 The Nurse from Brooklyn (1938)
 Full Confession (1939)
 They Made Her a Spy (1939)
 I Was a Prisoner on Devil's Island (1941)
 First Aid  (1943) (short subject)
 A Wave, a WAC and a Marine (1944)
 Strange Illusion (1945)
 Coroner Creek (1948)

References

External links

 
 Photographs of Sally Eilers

1908 births
1978 deaths
Actresses from New York City
People from Beverly Hills, California
American film actresses
American silent film actresses
American people of German descent
20th-century American actresses
Burials at Forest Lawn Memorial Park (Glendale)
New York (state) Democrats
California Democrats
Jewish American actresses
WAMPAS Baby Stars
Fairfax High School (Los Angeles) alumni
20th-century American Jews